The scarlet badis (Dario dario) is a tropical freshwater fish and one of the smallest known percoid fish species. It is a micropredator, feeding on small aquatic crustaceans, worms, insect larvae and other zooplankton. It is sold under a variety of names (Badis badis bengalensis, B. bengalensis) in the aquarium trade.

Description

Scarlet badis are among the smallest percoid fish species. Apart from the size difference, the sexes are easy to distinguish by the vibrant colors and prominent fins of the male.

Distribution and habitat
The distribution of this species appears to be restricted to tributary systems draining into the Brahmaputra River in parts of West Bengal and Assam states of India, although it might also range into Bhutan. It typically inhabits shallow, clear water streams with sand or gravel substrates and dense growths of marginal and/or aquatic vegetation.

Care in the aquarium
The scarlet badis is becoming increasingly popular as an aquarium fish, particularly in nano aquaria. Their territorial nature does however mean that their environment must contain sufficient boundaries to prevent aggressive behaviour, especially between males of the species. The careful aquarist would ensure that the tank is sufficiently filled with items of decoration capable of breaking up lines of sight and establishing territories. Natural driftwood or coconut shells used as caves are all ideal.

This species should only be considered for inclusion in an established and well-cycled aquarium with suitable water parameters.

Lending to its nature as a predator, small frozen or live foods such as blood worms or brine shrimp are preferred over processed foods such as pellets or flakes.

References

External links

scarlet badis
Tropical fish
Brahmaputra River
scarlet badis